Robert William Cochran-Patrick LLD (5 February 1842 – 15 March 1897) was a Scottish Conservative politician who sat in the House of Commons from 1880 to 1885.

Cochran-Patrick was the only son of William Charles Richard Cochran  of Woodside in Beith, Ayrshire, and his wife Agnes Cochran, daughter of William Cochran of Ladyland, Ayrshire. He was educated privately and then at the University of Edinburgh and Trinity Hall, Cambridge. He was a J.P. for Ayrshire and Renfrewshire and a Deputy Lieutenant for Ayrshire.

At the 1880 general election Cochran-Patrick was elected Member of Parliament for Ayrshire North. He held the seat until 1885. He was Permanent Under-Secretary for Scotland from 1887 to 1892 when he retired owing to ill-health. He was vice-chairman of the Scottish Fishery Board in 1896.

In 1876 he published his first book, entitled 'Records of the Coinage of Scotland from the earliest Period to the Union,' in 2 volumes. This concluded the a vast proportion of Scottish coins were made from natice gold and silver.

Cochran-Patrick died at the age of 55.

Cochran-Patrick married Eleanora Hunter daughter of Robert Hunter of Hunter, Ayrshire in 1866.

References

External links
 

1842 births
1897 deaths
UK MPs 1880–1885
Scottish Tory MPs (pre-1912)
Members of the Parliament of the United Kingdom for Scottish constituencies
Alumni of the University of Edinburgh
Alumni of Trinity Hall, Cambridge